The Cazoo UK Open is a ranking major darts tournament held annually at the Butlins Minehead Resort by the Professional Darts Corporation (PDC) in England. The event is often referred to as the "FA Cup of darts" as it has an unseeded open draw made after each round, and entry is open to players at all levels of darts. One-hundred-and-sixty players compete in the multi-board event over eight-stages before the PDC’s Top 32 enter the tournament in the fourth round. The tournament has a prize fund of £450,000; the victor’s prize is £100,000.

History
From 2003 to 2013, the UK Open took place in June each year at the Reebok Stadium, in Bolton. In 2014, it moved to Butlin's Minehead taking place in early March. Phil Taylor beat Shayne Burgess in the inaugural final. Dutchman Raymond van Barneveld won the tournament in 2006, in his first appearance in a PDC ranking event. He knocked out 13-times World Champion Phil Taylor 11–10 en route to the final where he beat Barrie Bates 13–7. He also successfully defended the title in 2007, again beating Taylor en route.

As the event has amateur and semi-professional qualifiers, it has produced some upset results over the years. In 2014, Aden Kirk, playing in his first televised match, beat defending and five-time champion Phil Taylor 9–7 in the third round. Kirk then beat Peter Wright 9–5 in the next round. In 2016, Rileys amateur qualifier Barry Lynn recorded a 9–3 win over reigning world champion Gary Anderson and reached the quarter-finals. A year later, Anderson lost to another Rileys qualifier, Paul Hogan, who followed up by beating Adrian Lewis in the next round.

Taylor achieved the perfect nine-dart finish four times (2004, 2005, 2007 & 2008). Mervyn King (2010), Gary Anderson (2012), Wes Newton (2013), Michael van Gerwen (2016 & 2020), Jonny Clayton (2020), Sebastian Białecki (2021), Jitse van der Wal (2021), José Justicia (2022), James Wade (2022) and Michael Smith (2022) have also achieved a nine-dart leg (although Newton's, Białecki’s, van der Wal’s and Justicia's were not televised live, while Clayton's and Smith's were only live on the PDC website). The tournament had a different runner-up for the first 13 years.

Because of extreme weather conditions and fears for the safety of visiting fans the unprecedented decision was taken by the host venue Butlins to play the entire 2018 UK Open behind closed doors leaving the public only being able to watch the event though ITV4’s live coverage and the PDC live web feed.

The Tournament was moved to the Marshall Arena in 2021 due to the COVID-19 pandemic and played behind closed doors.

Format
Qualifying events for amateur players are organised by Rileys and held in various locations across the UK. 16 players qualify through these events.

The format is as follows (as of 2020):
 First round: The 16 Rileys qualifiers, 8 Challenge Tour qualifiers, 8 Development Tour qualifiers and Tour Card holders ranked 97–128 in the PDC Order of Merit.
 Second round: Players ranked 65–96 in the PDC Order of Merit join the 32 winners of the first round.
 Third round: Players ranked 33–64 join the 32 winners of the second round.
 Fourth round to final: Players ranked 1–32 in the PDC Order of Merit join the 32 winners of the third round.

The draws for the first three rounds are made in full after all qualifying players are known, while the draws for the fourth round onward are made separately on stage as soon as each preceding round has concluded.

Finals

Records and statistics

Total finalist appearances

 Active players are shown in bold
 Only players who reached the final are included
 In the event of identical records, players are sorted in alphabetical order by family name

Champions by country

Nine-dart finishes
Fifteen nine-darters have been thrown at the UK Open. The first one was in 2004, and eleven of them have been televised. Wes Newton in 2013, Sebastian Białecki and Jitse van der Wal in 2021 and José Justicia in 2022 hit nine-darters that were not broadcast.

 not televised

High averages

Media coverage
From 2003 until 2013, coverage for the UK Open was shown on Sky Sports in June. In 2014 the tournament was moved to March and coverage of the event moved to ITV4.

References

Notes
Each year is linked to an article about that particular event's draw.

External links
 Official Page on PDC website
 PDC UK Open on Darts database

 
Professional Darts Corporation tournaments
Recurring sporting events established in 2003
2003 establishments in England
Annual sporting events in the United Kingdom